Anfield is the home stadium of Liverpool FC.

Anfield may also refer to:
Anfield, New Brunswick, a community in New Brunswick, Canada
Anfield (suburb), a district of Liverpool, England, UK
Anfield (ward), a Liverpool City Council ward in the Liverpool Walton Parliamentary constituency
Anfield Cemetery or the City of Liverpool Cemetery

See also
Annfield Plain,  a village in County Durham, England
Annfield Plain F.C., an amateur football club
Annfield Plain railway station, a former railway station
Annfield Stadium, a former football stadium in Stirling, Scotland